Peter Lampe (born 28 January 1954) is a German Protestant theologian and chaired Professor of New Testament Studies/History of Early Christianity at the University of Heidelberg in Germany.

Life

After studies in theology, philosophy and archaeology at Bielefeld and Göttingen (Germany) and Rome (Italy) he received his Ph.D. and his Dr. habil. at the University of Bern in Switzerland with works about the social history of the early Christians in the city of Rome in the first two centuries and about the concept of unity and community in the Pauline letters. Scholarships of the German Academic Scholarship Foundation (Studienstiftung) supported his university education and PhD  studies. From 1981 on he taught at the University of Bern as assistant professor ("Wissenschaftlicher Assistent") until, in 1986, he was called to a chair of New Testament Studies at Union Theological Seminary in Virginia, USA. In 1992, he took the chair of History and Archaeology of Early Christianity and Its Environment at the University of Kiel in Germany, where he also served as dean of the school of theology. In 1999, he accepted a call to a chair at the University of Heidelberg.

In 2005, he co-founded the Research Center for International and Interdisciplinary Theology (FIIT) at the University of Heidelberg, and in 1997 he founded the Societas Theologicum Adiuvantium in Kiel. He has been on the editorial board of international scholarly journals and book series. He is a K.St.J. (Germany), an ordained Lutheran minister, being married to Margaret Birdsong and having two children, Daniel and Jessica.

Work

His works focus on the social history of early Christianity (groundbreaking studies on, for example, early Christianity in Rome in the 1st/2nd centuries, and on Paul's correspondence with Philemon; his work also contributed decisively to the paradigm shift toward a more contextual reading of the Letter to the Romans); on the Hellenistic background of early Christianity; on Pauline studies (including rhetorical studies); on early Christian archaeology and epigraphy; as well as on methodological and hermeneutical questions. He pioneered applying constructivist categories to New Testament exegesis and hermeneutics. Furthermore, he was one of the first to explore the potential of psychological interpretation in his field.

From 2001 to 2008, he directed annual archaeological campaigns in Phrygia, Turkey. During these interdisciplinary campaigns, together with William Tabbernee of Tulsa, numerous unknown ancient settlements were discovered and archaeologically documented. Two of them are the best candidates so far in the search for the identification of the two holy centers of ancient Montanism, Pepouza and Tymion. The Montanist patriarch resided at Pepouza, and the Montanists expected the heavenly Jerusalem to descend to earth at Pepouza and Tymion. In late antiquity, both places attracted crowds of pilgrims from all over the Roman Empire. Scholars had searched for these lost sites since the 19th century.

Books

 1987 + 1989: Die stadtrömischen Christen in den ersten beiden Jahrhunderten: Untersuchungen zur Sozialgeschichte, Wissenschaftliche Untersuchungen zum Neuen Testament 2/18 (Mohr-Siebeck: Tübingen 1987; 2nd, revised and enlarged edition 1989) , ISSN 0340-9570, ISSN 0340-9570
 - translation of the 1987 Die Anfänge des Christentums: Alte Welt und neue Hoffnung
 1995: Pocahontas: Die Indianer-Prinzessin am Englischen Hof (Diederichs: München 1995) 
 1998: Die Briefe an die Philipper, Thessalonicher und an Philemon, NTD 8/2 (Vandenhoeck & Ruprecht: Göttingen 1998) (together with N. Walter and E. Reinmuth) , 
 2004: Felsen im Fluss: Schriftworte in provokativer Auslegung zu Themen der Zeit (Neukirchener: Neukirchen-Vluyn, 2004) 
 2005: Wortglassplitter (a book of poetry; Athena: Oberhausen, 2005) 
 2006: Die Wirklichkeit als Bild: Das Neue Testament als ein Grunddokument abendländischer Kultur im Lichte konstruktivistischer Epistemologie und Wissenssoziologie (Neukirchener: Neukirchen-Vluyn, 2006) .
 2007: Küsste Jesus Magdalenen mitten auf den Mund?: Provokationen, Einsprüche, Klarstellungen (Neukirchener: Neukirchen-Vluyn, 2007) 
 2008: Pepouza and Tymion: The Discovery and Archaeological Exploration of a Lost Ancient City and an Imperial Estate (deGruyter: Berlin/New York, 2008; together with W. Tabbernee)  und 
 2008: Neutestamentliche Exegese im Dialog: Hermeneutik – Wirkungsgeschichte – Matthäusevangelium (Neukirchener: Neukirchen-Vluyn 2008) (ed. together with M. Mayordomo, M. Sato) 
 2010: Neutestamentliche Grenzgänge: Symposium zur kritischen Rezeption der Arbeiten Gerd Theißens (Göttingen: Vandenhoek and Ruprecht 2010) (ed. together with H. Schwier) 
 2010: Paul and Rhetoric (New York/London: Clark 2010) (together with J.P. Sampley) 
 2012: New Testament Theology in a Secular World: A Constructivist Work in Philosophical Epistemology and Christian Apologetics (translated by Robert L. Brawley from the 2006 German edition with substantial subsequent revisions and augmentations by the author; London & New York: T&T Clark/Bloemsbury, 2012)  
 2019: Ad ecclesiae unitatem: Eine exegetisch-theologische und sozialpsychologische Paulusstudie (437 pp; Habilitationsschrift; Bern: Universität Bern, 1989) online: Heidelberg: Universitätsbibliothek Heidelberg, 2019, DOI: 10.11588/diglit.48669; https://digi.ub.uni-heidelberg.de/diglit/lampe1989
 2023: Los primeros cristianos en Roma: De Pablo a Valentín (603 pp; Salamanca: Ediciones Sígueme, 2023)

Awards

In 2003, Lampe received the German Ecumenical Preaching Award (Bonn, Germany). In 2008, he was made honorary professor at the University of the Free State in South Africa. In 1987, in the United States his German book Die stadtrömischen Christen was awarded the distinction of Scholar’s Choice (significant current theological literature from abroad). National merit scholarships of the German Academic Scholarship Foundation (Studienstiftung).

About Peter Lampe 

 E.-M. Becker, ed., Neutestamentliche Wissenschaft, UTB 2475, Tübingen – Basel:  2003, 167-175; http://www.ub.uni-heidelberg.de/archiv/25282
 Gerd Theißen im Gespräch mit Peter Lampe, Jahresheft der Theologischen Fakultät der Universität Heidelberg 9 (2013/14), 61-68; http://www.ub.uni-heidelberg.de/archiv/25149
 Ute E. Eisen & Heidrun E. Mader, eds., Talking God in Society: Multidisciplinary (Re)constructions of Ancient (Con)texts. Festschrift for Peter Lampe, vol. I: Theories and Applications (807 pp.) & vol. II: Hermeneuein in Global Contexts: Past and Present (532 pp.), NTOA 120/1+2, Vandenhoeck & Ruprecht/Göttingen: 2020 (vol. I: ISBN Print: 9783525573174, ISBN E-Book: 9783647573175; vol. II: ISBN Print: 9783525573181, ISBN E-Book: 9783647573182); especially vol. I, pp. 9-13 (about Lampe's oeuvre) & vol. II, pp. 495-521 (Lampe's bibliography)

References

External links
 Picture, cv and bibliography of Peter Lampe: Webpage of the University of Heidelberg
 FIIT Webpage about Peter Lampe
 Who’s Who in the World (2003 ff) and Wer ist Wer (2003 ff)
 Peter Lampe in German Wikipedia
 German Ecumenical Preaching Award
 Research Center for International and Interdisciplinary Theology
 Societas Theologicum Ordinem Adiuvantium
 Portrait of Peter Lampe in DIE ZEIT

1954 births
Living people
German biblical scholars
German Christian theologians
20th-century German Protestant theologians
21st-century German Protestant theologians
New Testament scholars
University of Bern alumni
Union Presbyterian Seminary faculty
Academic staff of the University of Kiel
Academic staff of Heidelberg University
German male non-fiction writers